Preeti Malhotra has been the Chairman of the Smart Bharat Group, a diversified conglomerate, with interests in reality, hospitality, entertainment, preventive healthcare, finance and also venturing into new age projects. This is a part of Smart Group which has its footprint across India, China, ASEAN, Middle-East, USA, UK and Africa. Preeti also serves as a director on the board of several group of companies.

An Accomplished global professional, Preeti has over 30 years of experience in top leadership positions. She specialises in Business Strategy, Corporate Affairs, Corporate Governance, Policy Development, strategic alliances, JV's and new projects, collaborations, investor relations, mergers, Acquisitions, takeovers, IPOs, shareholding divestments, fund raising and project management. 

She is the first ever woman President of the Institute of the company secretaries of India (ICSI) and also the first ever woman to lead any premier national professional body of India. She has been active in the field of corporate governance and has been a member of various expert committees including JJ Irani Committee in 2005 constituted by the Ministry of Corporate Affairs, Government of India, to advise the government on the Company Law. She was a member of the Board of Governors of the Indian Institute of Corporate Affairs, a body of the Ministry of Corporate Affairs, Government of India. Further, she was also a member of the Committee to review Offences & Penalties and member of the Appellate Authority constituted by the Ministry of Corporate Affairs, Government of India.

She has been chairing the ASSOCHAM National Council on Corporate Affairs, Corporate Governance and CSR for several years. Previously, she was also the Chair of the ASSOCHAM Audit Committee. Preeti is a member of the Company Law Standing Committee, constituted by the Ministry of Corporate Affairs Government of India since 2019.

Early life and education
After completing her schooling from Convent of Jesus of Mary, New Delhi, Preeti graduated with honours (Bachelor’s in Commerce) from Delhi University in 1985. She obtained her law degree from Faculty of Law, Delhi University in 1988 and a degree in Company Secretary from ICSI in 1991. More recently in 2019, she also completed the Executive Program on Exponential Technologies offered by Singularity University in Silicon Valley (California), USA.

Career
Preeti Malhotra started her professional career  in 1990 as a company secretary with Modi Xerox/Xerox Modicorp Limited - this company was a joint venture between Xerox Corporation and Dr. BK Modi led Smart Group. Preeti was also the Company Secretary of Modi Telstra Limited - a joint venture between the Dr. BK Modi group and Australia's Telstra corporation which orchestrated India's first mobile call. At the group level, she oversaw the legal, corporate affairs and corporate governance for Modi International Paper and Spice Communications - a telecom joint venture between the Dr. Modi group and the Malaysia's Axiata (formerly Telekom Malaysia). In 2002, she was also appointed as the Director & company secretary of Spice Limited, Executive Director in Spice Mobility Ltd. (now DigiSpice) and then Executive Director with Smart Ventures P.Ltd. She was also on the board of Si2i Limited (now Digilife Technologies Limited), a Singapore listed entity.

Preeti became the Executive Director of Smart Global Corporate Holdings Limited which is a corporate arm and holding company of the Dr. Modi led Smart Group. She continued to serve on the board of Smart Bharat Private Limited, Fountain Life New York LLC (a joint venture between Fountain Life Holdings LLC, USA & Beyond 100 New York Inc,) and Modi Fountain Life ( an Indian JV between Fountain Life Holding LLC, USA and Smart Health City Private Limited).

Preeti has been an active contributor to various policy initiatives of the Govt. Of India. When she was a member of the JJ Irani Committee in 2005, constituted by the Ministry of Corporate Affairs, Government of India, her suggestions on issues related to incorporation and registration of companies, as well as management and board governance, were taken on board. She also gave inputs to the government in the drafting of the Limited Liability Partnership Law. She was invited by OECD to speak at the Asian round Table Discussions on Corporate Governance in 2005 and 2006.

She was elected as a member of the NIRC and became the First Woman Chairman of the NIRC in 2002. Preeti then went on to be elected as a Central Council Member of the ICSI for two terms and in 2007 she became the first-ever woman president of the Institute of Company Secretaries of India (ICSI). Since then, Preeti has served as a member on several standing committees and boards constituted by the Ministry of Corporate Affairs, Government of India. These include, the Board of Governors of the Indian Institute of Corporate Affairs, The Appellate Authority and the Company Law Standing Committee, Committee to review Offences & Penalties etc.

Honorary positions held
 First ever Woman President of the ICSI in 2007. - As president of the ICSI, she launched an e-learning portal to help students looking to pursue company secretary education in rural and remote areas and introduced virtual classrooms through internet-enabled phones.   She was also the first chairperson of the global task force formed by the International Federation of Company Secretary (IFCS) to establish standards for education, qualification, training, code of ethics for company secretaries working across the globe. She led the establishment of the International Secretarial standard board, composed of company secretaries of CS institutes in various countries.
 First Woman Chairman of NIRC of ICSI in 2002.
 Member of Dr. JJ Irani Committee in 2005.

 Member of the National Advisory Committee of Accounting Standards in India (NACAS) in 2007
 Member of the governing council of National Foundation for Corporate Governance (NFCG) in 2007
 Founder-Member and Director, Global Citizen Forum  and Foreign Investors India Forum (FIIF)
 Chairman, ASSOCHAM National Council of Company Law, Corporate Governance & CSR
 Chairman, ASSOCHAM Audit Committee
 Member, Board of Governors of the Indian Institute of Corporate Affairs. This is the think tank, research, service delivery & capacity building arm of the Ministry of Corporate Affairs (Govt. of India) 
 Member, Appellate Authority of the Ministry of Corporate Affairs, Government of India
 Member, Committee to review offences & penalties, Ministry of Corporate Affairs, Government of India
 Member, Company Law Standing Committee, Ministry of Corporate Affairs, Government of India since 2019

Awards and recognition
 Bharat Nirman Talented Ladies Award in 2003.
 Vocational Service Excellence Award by Rotary Club of New Delhi in 2009.
 “Recognition of Excellence Award” - She received it on behalf of ICSI as its Past President during the Celebration of India Corporate Week 2009 by Ministry of Corporate Affairs.

Corporate social responsibility
Preeti has been strongly committed to the cause of establishing and building Corporate Social Responsibility amongst the Indian corporates. As Chairperson of the ASSOCHAM National Council for Corporate Affairs, Corporate Governance and CSR she has instituted the
 ASSOCHAM CSR EXCELLENCE AWARDS
 ASSOCHAM Corporate Governance awards.

She is strong advocate of inclusive growth & gender parity and is a Founder-Member of the Global Citizen Forum  which a not for profit organization working towards creating One interconnected world. Going beyond nationality, gender, religion and boundaries. In addition, she has been a Founder-Director of the Foreign Investors India Forum, a industry body dedicated to promoting FDI in India.

References

External links 
 Preeti Malhotra Blog
 Reuters
 BW Businessworld - Latest Business News in India, Economy in India, Business in India, Business Columnist in India
 Smart Entertainment appoints Preeti Malhotra as chairman of the company and board - ET BrandEquity
 We Will Focus On Smart Mobile Banking: Preeti Malhotra
 Shattering the glass ceiling
 Shardul Shroff, Ajay Bahl on Company Law Committee to suggest reforms in Companies Act and LLP Act
 Smart Group and A4M concluded their first India Conference 2020
 Dr. BK Modi launches India's first and most innovative Anti-Aging Centre
 Women of Worth Conclave
 
 

1965 births
Living people